Mazeppa is a 1993 French drama film directed by Bartabas. It was entered into the 1993 Cannes Film Festival where it won the Technical Grand Prize. It is part of the cultural legacy of Mazeppa, a Ukrainian hero and a narrative poem by Lord Byron.

Plot 
Based loosely on French painter Théodore Géricault's life who met the famous equestrian Antonio Franconi, the director of the Cirque Olympique. Gericault decided to stay and live with the circus and painted only horses to try and understand the mystery of this animal. Mazeppa embodies a man carried away by his passion.

Cast
 Miguel Bosé - Gericault
 Bartabas - Franconi
 Brigitte Marty - Mouste
 Eva Schakmundes - Alexandrine
 Fatima Aibout - Cascabelle
 Bakary Sangaré - Joseph
 Norman Calabrese - Ami de Géricault
 Henri Carballido - Ami de Géricault
 Frédéric Chavan - Ami de Géricault
 Patrick Kabakdjian - Ami de Géricault
 Michel Lacaille - Ami de Géricault
 Claire Leroy - Amie de Géricault
 Bernard Malandain - Ami de Géricault

References

External links

1993 films
1990s French-language films
1993 drama films
Films directed by Bartabas
Films about horses
Circus films
Films produced by Marin Karmitz
French drama films
1990s French films